Merline is a feminine given name. Notable people with the name include:

 Merline Johnson ( 1910s), American jazz singer
 Merline Pitre (born 1943), American historian

Feminine given names